Magnolia macrophylla, the bigleaf magnolia, is a deciduous magnolia native to the southeastern United States and eastern Mexico. This species boasts the largest simple leaf and single flower of any native plant in North America.

Classification

Magnolia macrophylla has three subspecies; some botanists treat these plants as three separate species:

Magnolia macrophylla subsp. macrophylla. Bigleaf magnolia. Southeastern United States. Secure. Tree to 20 m; leaves 50–90 cm long, fruit 4–10 cm long with more than 50 carpels.
Magnolia macrophylla subsp. ashei (Wetherby) Spongberg. Ashe magnolia. Northwest Florida. Shrub or small tree to 12 m; leaves 25–60 cm long, fruit 4–5 cm long with less than 50 carpels.  Considered by some botanists to be a distinct species, Magnolia ashei.
Magnolia macrophylla subsp. dealbata (Zuccarini) J. D. Tobe. Mexican bigleaf magnolia, Cloudforest magnolia, or eloxochitl. Mexico (Hidalgo to Oaxaca and Veracruz, in cloud forests). Tree to 20 m; leaves 30–60 cm long, fruit 8–15 cm long with more than 70 carpels. Considered by some botanists to be a distinct species, Magnolia dealbata.

Description
The bigleaf magnolia is a medium-sized understory tree 15–20 m tall. This species is distinguished from other magnolias by the large leaf size, 25–80 cm long and 11–30 cm broad. The largest leaf to be reported by a credible source is 3 ft 8 in (110 centimeters) in length. in addition to a six inch (15 centimeter) petiole. The leaf's width can be up to eighteen inches (45 centimeters).  The tree's branches often bend under the weight of this heavy foliage. The flowers are typically six or nine-petaled (two or three whorls of three petals each, the larger ones with a dime-sized purple blotch at the base). The flower has as many as 580 stamens and 
is typically about sixteen inches (41 centimeters) wide, although there have been specimens as large as 21.5 inches (55 centimeters) in width.  It is the largest temperate (non-tropical) flower in the world. This, like all Magnolias, is beetle pollinated. The fruit is a cone-like cluster of achenes.  The mature seeds, each covered with an orange aril, hang down from the cone on silk-like threads. making themselves readily available to passing birds.

Bee Mortality
At the Arnold Arboretum, dead bees have been observed inside Bigleaf magnolia flowers.

Distribution and habitat
Bigleaf magnolia is found in rich mesic woods; any disturbance that lets more light reach the ground is beneficial to the establishment of bigleaf magnolia, but despite its relatively fast growth-rate when stimulated by more light, other understory and canopy trees/seedlings are usually able to outgrow and out-compete it. This suits the plant just fine as it is tolerant of low light levels; it does not need full sun to survive once established (however, it does not tolerate full shade). Natural regeneration is quite limited due to the scarcity of mature, seed-bearing plants and the fact that this tree's population mostly consists of widely scattered individuals. In addition, this species is plagued by poor seed set (most likely from limiting factors mentioned above) and low seed viability, a trait shared by its cousin and frequent associate in the wild in Appalachia, the Fraser magnolia.

The Ashe magnolia is a rare shrub, exceptionally a small tree, that is found only along the bluffs and ravines adjacent to the Apalachicola River in Florida, along with several other rare plants unique to the area, such as Florida Yew and Florida torreya. It resembles the typical subsp. macrophylla, but has shorter, broader leaves, smaller flowers, and longer fruits. The  flowers bloom in late spring, and are white with rose-purple blotches on the inner tepals. The fruit is eaten by wildlife, but because of the plant's scarceness, it does not form a significant portion of any creature's diet.

In the southeastern United States, especially Alabama and surrounding areas, Magnolia macrophylla is sometimes called the "cowcumber magnolia," in contrast with the much smaller-leaved cucumber-tree magnolia, M. acuminata.

Threats
Collection, both legal and illegal, may have an adverse impact on this tree's population due to low population density, and high collection pressure can extirpate this species locally.  Bigleaf magnolia is listed as threatened in North Carolina and endangered in Arkansas and Ohio.  The Florida Department of Agriculture lists the Ashe magnolia as endangered, due to its small population and restricted range. The Mexican bigleaf magnolia is also endangered, by loss of habitat.

Cultivation
Bigleaf magnolia is often short-lived under cultivation unless its rather demanding requirements are met. This tree likes loose, undisturbed rich mesic soil (or mulch and compost substitutes) in full sun or part shade with moist, well-drained soil and a low pH. This tree will likely succeed in sites that closely mimic its natural habitat and where it is protected from strong wind that can tatter its large foliage. It can be grown farther north than its southerly range suggests, but needs watering during extended dry periods. This plant is generally problem-free.

Gallery

References

External links

Magnolia macrophylla images at the Arnold Arboretum of Harvard University Plant Image Database
Hetman, Jon. "Magnolia macrophylla". Arnold Arboretum of Harvard University website, 13 May 2019. Accessed 20 April 2020.
Friedman, William (Ned)."Killer magnolias".Posts from the Collections, Arnold Arboretum of Harvard University website, 20 July 2019. Accessed 20 April 2020.
An ecological study of Magnolia macrophylla in Gaston County, NC
Magnolia macrophylla images at bioimages.vanderbilt.edu
Field Guide to the Rare Plants and Animals of Florida Online:  Magnolia ashei
Magnolia macrophylla Distribution Map
Interactive Distribution Map of Magnolia macrophylla

macrophylla
Endangered flora of the United States
Trees of Northeastern Mexico
Trees of the Southeastern United States
Garden plants of North America
Ornamental trees